Raiarctus is a genus of tardigrades in the family Styraconyxidae. The genus was named and first described by Jeanne Renaud-Mornant in 1981.

Species
The genus includes five species:
 Raiarctus aureolatus Renaud-Mornant, 1981
 Raiarctus colurus Renaud-Mornant, 1981 - type species
 Raiarctus jesperi Jørgensen, Boesgaard, Møbjerg & Kristensen, 2014
 Raiarctus katrinae Jørgensen, Boesgaard, Møbjerg & Kristensen, 2014
 Raiarctus variabilis D’Addabbo Gallo, Grimaldi de Zio & Morone De Lucia, 1986

References

Further reading
 Renaud-Mornant, 1981 : Raiarctus colurus n. g., n. sp., et R. aureolatus n. sp., tardigrades (Arthrotardigrada) marins nouveaux de sédiments calcaires.Bulletin from the Muséum National d'Histoire Naturelle, Section A: Zoology, Biology and Animal Ecology, vol. 3, no 2, p. 515-522.

Tardigrade genera
Styraconyxidae